Podvoloshino is a rural locality (a village) in Asovskoye Rural Settlement, Beryozovsky District, Perm Krai, Russia. The population was 190 as of 2010. There are 5 streets.

Geography 
Podvoloshino is located 35 km southeast of  Beryozovka (the district's administrative centre) by road. Shestaki is the nearest rural locality.

References 

Rural localities in Beryozovsky District, Perm Krai